The Belleville Senators are a professional ice hockey team in the American Hockey League (AHL) that began play in the 2017–18 season as the top minor league affiliate of the National Hockey League team, the Ottawa Senators.  Based in Belleville, Ontario, Canada, the Senators play their home games at CAA Arena. The franchise was previously based out of Binghamton, New York, as the Binghamton Senators.

History
In July 2016, Broome County officials stated that the Ottawa Senators intended to relocate their franchise, then known as the Binghamton Senators, closer to the parent club for the 2017–18 season despite still having three more years on their lease. On September 26, 2016, Ottawa Senators owner Eugene Melnyk confirmed that he had purchased the Binghamton team and would be relocating it to become the Belleville Senators for the 2017–18 season with the Binghamton Devils eventually announced to be taking over their lease. In order to accommodate an AHL team, the City of Belleville approved more than $20 million in upgrades to Yardmen Arena once the Senators agreed to an eight-year lease.

The Senators kept Kurt Kleinendorst as head coach for the franchise's inaugural season in Belleville, but after a 29–42–2–3 record and missing the playoffs, his contract was not renewed. He was replaced by Troy Mann, the recently released coach of the Hershey Bears. The team improved in the 2018–19 season, finishing fifth-place in the North Division behind the play of younger players Drake Batherson, Logan Brown, Rudolfs Balcers, and Erik Brannstrom.

Led by Josh Norris, Alex Formenton, and Drake Batherson, the B-Sens were leading the North Division when the 2019–20 AHL season was cancelled on May 11 due to the COVID-19 pandemic. The team had amassed a 38–20–4–1 record and were the best road team in the league having won 23 games and a .790 road win percentage. The B-Sens' 234 goals were the most in the AHL.

The start for the following 2020–21 AHL season was delayed due to the ongoing pandemic. In December 2020, the Senators agreed to a seven-year lease extension with the city of Belleville through the 2026–27 AHL season. In January 2021, the league announced a temporary realignment due to the pandemic border restrictions and the B-Sens were placed in an all-Canada division, but had no set start date due to venue usage and restrictions in the province of Ontario. The league eventually announced a start for the teams in Canada for one week after the rest of the league, but without any games initially scheduled in Ontario. The Belleville Senators started on the road before announcing their home games would be played in Ottawa at the Canadian Tire Centre for the entire season.

Broadcasting 
The official broadcasting partner of the Belleville Senators is radio station 800 CJBQ. Commentators David Foot and Jack Miller cover all games. David Foot also has a weekly podcast featuring news on the Belleville Senators and the AHL.

Season-by-season results

Players

Current roster
Updated March 16, 2023.

Team captains
Mike Blunden, 2017–18
Erik Burgdoerfer, 2018–19
Jordan Szwarz, 2019–20
Logan Shaw, 2021–22
Dillon Heatherington, 2022–present

Team scoring leaders

''Note: Pos = Position; GP = Games played; G = Goals; A = Assists; Pts = Points; P/G = Points per game average;

References

External links
 

 
American Hockey League teams
Ottawa Senators minor league affiliates
Ice hockey teams in Ontario
Ice hockey clubs established in 2016
Sport in Belleville, Ontario
2016 establishments in Ontario